The 44th Venice Biennale, held in 1990, was an exhibition of international contemporary art, with 49 participating nations. The Venice Biennale takes place biennially in Venice, Italy. Prizewinners of the 44th Biennale included: Giovanni Anselmo and Bernd and Hilla Becher (International Prize/Golden Lions), the American pavilion with Jenny Holzer (best national representation), and Anish Kapoor (best young artist).

Awards 

 International Prize: Golden Lion – Giovanni Anselmo; Golden Lion for sculpture – Bernd and Hilla Becher
 Golden Lion for best national representation: American pavilion with Jenny Holzer 
 Premio 2000 (young artist): Anish Kapoor
 Premia (purchase) of the Cassa di Risparmio di Venezia: Giuseppe Pulvirenti

References

Bibliography

Further reading 

 
 
 
 

1990 in art
1990 in Italy
Venice Biennale exhibitions